Eucalodium is a genus of land snails in the family Eucalodiidae.

Species
 Eucalodium australis F. G. Thompson, 1963
 Eucalodium blandianum Crosse & P. Fischer, 1868
 Eucalodium cereum Strebel, 1880
 Eucalodium compactum Pilsbry, 1893
 Eucalodium decollatum (Nyst, 1841)
 Eucalodium decurtatum (H. Adams, 1872)
 Eucalodium densecostatum Strebel, 1880
 Eucalodium deshayesianum Crosse & P. Fischer, 1872
 Eucalodium edwardsianum Crosse & P. Fischer, 1872
 † Eucalodium eophilum Cockerell, 1915 
 Eucalodium grande (L. Pfeiffer, 1860)
 Eucalodium hegewischi (Bartsch, 1947)
 Eucalodium hippocastaneum Dall, 1897
 Eucalodium insigne Crosse & P. Fischer, 1872
 Eucalodium ischnostele (Pilsbry, 1909)
 Eucalodium mariae (Bartsch, 1947)
 Eucalodium marianum (Bartsch, 1943)
 Eucalodium mexicanum (L. Pfeiffer, 1860)
 Eucalodium moussonianum Crosse & P. Fischer, 1872
 Eucalodium neglectum Crosse & P. Fischer, 1872
 Eucalodium otoides F. G. Thompson, 1968
 Eucalodium speciosum (Dunker, 1844)
 Eucalodium splendidum (L. Pfeiffer, 1860)
 Eucalodium sumichrasti Crosse & P. Fischer, 1878
 Eucalodium walpoleanum Crosse & P. Fischer, 1872
Species brought into synonymy
 Eucalodium dalli E. von Martens, 1901: synonym of Anisospira dalli (E. von Martens, 1901) (original combination)
 Eucalodium vonmartensi Strebel, 1880: synonym of Anisospira vonmartensi (Strebel, 1880) (original combination)

References

 Crosse, H. & Fischer, P., 1878. Diagnoses Molluscorum novorum, reipublicae Mexicanae incolarum. Journal de Conchyliologie 26: 250-251
 Crosse, H. & Fischer, P., 1879. Description d'un genre nouveau et de deux espèces de Mollusques terrestres, provenant du Mexique. Journal de Conchyliologie 27: 46-49
 Bank, R. A. (2017). Classification of the Recent terrestrial Gastropoda of the World. Last update: July 16, 2017

Eucalodiidae